Daniel Eric Gold (born September 19, 1975 in Los Angeles, California) is an American actor. He attended Lee Strasberg's Theater Institute as a teenager, and went on to graduate from Penn State in 1996, with a degree in Theater Arts.

Career

Theater 
Gold moved to Chicago after college where he performed as Michael in Jean Cocteau's Indescretions, Oak Park Festivals Much Ado About Nothing and Patrick Marber's Dealer's Choice. In May 1998, he landed the part of Ste in Jonathan Harvey's coming of age play Beautiful Thing at The Famous Door Theater in Chicago. Its success there brought the whole cast to the Cherry Lane Theatre in NY, where it opened to rave reviews in February 1999.

Since moving to NY's West Village in 2000, Gold has played several theater roles. For Craig Lucas, he performed in This Thing of Darkness at the Atlantic Theater, A Small Tragedy and a role written especially for him in The Singing Forest. He performed in Loot and Singing Forest for the regional theater Intiman in Seattle.

He is a 2004 nominee for the Lucille Lortel Award for acting in the Craig Lucas Obie winning play, Small Tragedy.
In June 2005, Gold was in Roundabout's The Paris Letter with John Glover and Ron Rifkin. That role was followed by Eric Bogosian's subUrbia.

Film and television 
Film roles include War of the Worlds with Tom Cruise. Charlie Wilson's War with Tom Hanks. Definitely, Maybe with Ryan Reynolds, Birds of America again for Craig Lucas and Spinning into Butter with Sarah Jessica Parker.  Other roles include Ang Lee's Taking Woodstock and Last Night with Keira Knightley and The Harvest in post production.

2009 marked Gold's debut TV role in Ugly Betty as Matt Hartley, the love interest for the title character, played by America Ferrera.

Gold was in the independent film Café in Philadelphia, with Jennifer Love Hewitt and Jamie Kennedy.

He also appears in national commercials for McDonald's and AFLAC.

Personal life
Gold lives in Brooklyn with his family. He is of English and Jewish descent.

Theatre

Filmography

Film

Television

Awards and nominations

References

External links

Daniel Eric Gold at Internet Off-Broadway Database

1975 births
20th-century American male actors
21st-century American male actors
Male actors from Los Angeles
American male film actors
American male television actors
American people of English descent
American male stage actors
Jewish American male actors
Living people
Penn State College of Arts and Architecture alumni
People from Brooklyn
21st-century American Jews